The 1922 season was the eleventh season for Santos FC.

References

External links
Official Site 

Santos
1922
1922 in Brazilian football